Lernanist (also Romanized as Lerrnanist; formerly, Verin Akhta and Verkhnyaya Akhta) is a town in the Kotayk Province of Armenia.  It is home to the descendants of Armenian settlers from Van who survived the Armenian genocide.

See also 
Kotayk Province

References

External links 

World Gazeteer: Armenia – World-Gazetteer.com

Winter tourism center in Lernanist

Populated places in Kotayk Province